The individual show jumping event, part of the equestrian program at the 2004 Summer Olympics, was held from 22 to 27 August 2004 in the Olympic Equestrian Centre on the outskirts of Markopoulo in the Attica region of Greece.  Like all other equestrian events, the jumping competition was mixed gender, with both male and female athletes competing in the same division. There were 77 competitors from 27 nations. Each nation could send up to 4 riders. Cian O'Connor of Ireland initially received the gold medal, but that medal was stripped from him due to doping. After his disqualification, the event was won by Rodrigo Pessoa of Brazil, the nation's first medal in individual jumping. Silver went to Chris Kappler of the United States, with bronze to Marco Kutscher of Germany.

Doping test

On 8 October 2004, the International Federation for Equestrian Sports (FEI) announced that the A-samples from four Olympic horses had failed doping control, and the Equestrian Federation of Ireland said one of these was Cian O'Connor's horse, Waterford Crystal. The urine B-sample went missing en route to a testing laboratory, prompting a flurry of media interest. On 9 November, testing of the blood B-sample confirmed traces of fluphenazine and zuclopenthixol. On 27 March 2005, the FEI gave a ruling disqualifying O'Connor and banning him from competition for three months, while accepting his contention that the drugs were administered by a vet as part of a sedative for a leg injury and were not with intent to enhance performance. O'Connor decided not to appeal and began his suspension on 11 April 2005. He was formally stripped of his medal at the end of the appeal window, on 3 July 2005.

Rodrigo Pessoa was presented with his gold medal in August 2005 at a ceremony on Copacabana Beach.

Background

This was the 22nd appearance of the event, which had first been held at the 1900 Summer Olympics and has been held at every Summer Olympics at which equestrian sports have been featured (that is, excluding 1896, 1904, and 1908). It is the oldest event on the current programme, the only one that was held in 1900.

Three of the top 12 riders (including ties for 10th place) from the 2000 Games returned: fourth-place finishers Ludo Philippaerts of Belgium and Otto Becker of Germany and tenth-place finisher Thomas Velin of Denmark. 1992 Olympic gold medalist Ludger Beerbaum of Germany also returned. The reigning World Champion, Dermott Lennon of Ireland, did not compete due to an injury to his horse, Liscalgot. Other notable absences included Marcus Ehning (also due to equine injury) and Meredith Michaels-Beerbaum (positive doping test), both of Germany. Despite those absences, Germany still had a strong team (sweeping the podium at the European championships). Rodrigo Pessoa was among the favorites, as he had been in 2000 before refusals derailed his final round ride in Sydney.

Greece made its debut in the event. France competed for the 20th time, most of any nation.

Competition format

The competition used the five-round format introduced in 1992, with three rounds in the qualifying round and two rounds in the final.

For the qualifying round, each pair competed in three rounds. The total score across all three rounds counted for advancement to the individual final; the second and third rounds counted towards the team score. The individual competition allowed 45 pairs to advance to the final, though only three pairs per nation were allowed. Scores did not carry over to the final.

In the final, there were two rounds. All of the finalists competed in the first, but only the top 20 pairs competed again in the second round. The combined score for the two rounds was the result for those pairs. A jump-off would be used if necessary to break ties for medal positions; other ties would not be broken.

Schedule

All times are Greece Standard Time (UTC+2)

Results

Qualifying round

Round 1

10 of the 77 pairs had flawless rides in the first qualifying round. The two riders who were eliminated during the round automatically received a score 20 points higher than the highest other score and continued to compete in the second round.

Round 2

The second qualifying round was also the first team round. Only one pair continued to progress without any penalties, though 27 had 10 or fewer.

Round 3

The third individual qualifier was also the second team round. All athletes competed individually regardless of their team's qualification. 45 pairs advanced to the final round. Only three pairs from any single NOC could advance. This meant that all pairs through 51st place were qualified, as that was the lowest place that would allow for no less than 45 pairs to advance after teams that had four qualified pairs selected three of them. Since there was a tie for 51st place, a total of 46 pairs advanced.

Final round

Round A

Beezie Madden was assessed her first penalties of the event in the fourth round. Unfortunately for her but fortunately for many of the other pairs, all the scores had reset after the third qualifying round.

Round B

The 18-way tie for twelfth-place resulted in 29 pairs advancing to the second round of the final. O'Connor had a clean round, finishing the two-round final with 4 faults and the gold medal—which was later stripped. A jump-off was required to break the tie for the silver medal. Royal Kaliber, an American horse ridden by Chris Kappler, was injured during the jump-off and the pair halted. Despite the injury, they received bronze medals (later upgraded to silver with the disqualification of O'Connor). Rodrigo Pessoa and his horse Baloubet du Rouet earned 4 penalties in the jump-off, completing the course in 49.42 seconds; their silver medals were later upgraded to gold.

Jump-off

References

External links 
. FEI. Retrieved on 2008-09-25

Individual jumping